The Sarychat glacier is a north-south-aligned glacier in the Western Kokshaal-Too mountains of southern Kyrgyzstan. The southernmost ridge delimiting the glacier marks the border with China. The Sarychat glacier is one of two glaciers which feed the Sarychat river before it merges with the Aytali, the other being the Fersmana Glacier to the west.

Glaciers of Kyrgyzstan